Bothriomyrmex laticeps is a species of ant in the genus Bothriomyrmex. Described by Emery in 1925, the species is endemic to France.

References

Bothriomyrmex
Hymenoptera of Europe
Insects described in 1925